Ángel Leopoldo López-Escobar (1940 – June 29, 2013) was a Chilean geochemistry academic. His scientific career begun by studying Biology and Chemistry at the Pontifical Catholic University of Chile. Later he worked at the Austral University of Chile and the University of Chile. In 1996 he started a metallogeny research group at the University of Concepción.

References
Ángel Leopoldo López Escobar (1940-2013)

Chilean geochemists
People from Santiago
Chilean volcanologists
Pontifical Catholic University of Chile alumni
Academic staff of the Austral University of Chile
Academic staff of the University of Chile
Academic staff of the University of Concepción
1940 births
2013 deaths